Manito Park and Botanical Gardens is a  public park with arboretum, botanical gardens, and conservatory, located at 17th Ave and Grand Blvd in Spokane, Washington, United States. It is open daily without charge.

History

The park was originally a public recreation area called Montrose Park. In 1903 its name was changed to Manito, from the Algonquian word manitou. A park commission was formed in 1907 with annual funding, and in 1913 the famed Olmsted Brothers firm completed their landscaping plans for Spokane parks, including Manito Park. The Park was at one time a zoo until 1932 when the zoo closed down because of the lack of funding during the Great Depression. Today some remnants of the zoo can still be seen, such as an iron bar sticking out of a rock that was once part of the bear cages.

The park
Aside from the gardens, Manito is home to more common park fare. The park has two play structures, one in "upper Manito" and the other by the duck pond at "lower Manito". The duck pond lies in the northwest corner of the park and is home to many ducks and geese. The Park Bench Cafe, located at the intersection of Manito Place and Tekoa St., is a small cafe which serves drinks and snacks during the Summer. Sections of the park remain in a natural, wild state. Exposed basalt is common throughout the park, especially so in the undeveloped areas where large rocks and cliffs dominate the landscape.   
During Winter the grass covered hills of lower Manito are a popular destination for sledding.

The gardens

 Duncan Garden - formal  European garden with a large granite fountain; designed and built in 1913.  The arrangement of the flower beds, and also the plants make the Duncan Garden symmetrical.
 Joel E. Ferris Perennial Garden - perennial plants.
 Gaiser Conservatory - greenhouse located immediately north of the Duncan Garden. One wing contains desert plants and the other contains tropical plants.
 Nishinomiya Tsutakawa Japanese Garden - in honor of Nishinomiya, Japan, Spokane's sister city. In 1967 noted landscape architect Nagao Sakurai began its design. After his stroke in 1973, designs were completed by Shosuke Nagai and Hirohiko Kawai and the garden was dedicated in 1974.
 Rose Hill - 1500 rose bushes representing over 150 varieties; an All-America Selections rose test garden.
Dahlia Garden - one of the American Dahlia Society's eight trial gardens. Adjacent to Rose Hill.
Lilac Garden - over 100 cultivars represented; Spokane is known as the "Lilac City".

Activities

Activities such as baseball, sledding, tennis, and bird watching are very popular among casual visitors.  Some of the more alternative activities observed at the park include frolf, and parkour.

See also
 List of botanical gardens in the United States

References

External links

 Manito Park Spokane Washington
 Friends of Manito
Brad Sondahl's Photos of Manito Park

Arboreta in Washington (state)
Botanical gardens in Washington (state)
Parks in Spokane County, Washington
Tourist attractions in Spokane, Washington
Japanese gardens in the United States
Japanese-American culture in Washington (state)
Geography of Spokane, Washington
Former zoos
Greenhouses in Washington (state)
Zoos disestablished in 1932